Venetian often means from or related to:
 Venice, a city in Italy
 Veneto, a region of Italy
 Republic of Venice (697–1797), a historical nation in that area 

Venetians might refer to:
 Masters of Venetian painting in 15th-16th centuries
 City dwellers of Venice

Venetian and the like may also refer to:
 Venetian language, a Romance language spoken mostly in the Veneto region
 Venice, Florida, a city in Sarasota County, United States
The Venetian Las Vegas, a resort hotel and casino in Las Vegas, Nevada
The Venetian Macao, a hotel and casino in Macau, China
Venetian blind, or Venetian, a common type of window blind similar to Persian blind
Venetian curtain, a type of theater front curtain
The Venetian Woman, The Venetian Comedy, or The Venetian originally La veniexiana (play), a comedy in Venetian language, 1535-1537
The Venetians, an 1892 novel by Mary Elizabeth Braddon
The Venetian (play), a work by Clifford Bax
The Venetian (film), a 1958 TV movie directed by Ingmar Bergman
The Venetian Woman (La venexiana), 1986 Italian erotic film by Mauro Bolognini
Venetian fonts or typefaces

See also 
 Friulan, related to or from Friuli Venezia Giulia region of Italy
 Venice (disambiguation)
 Veneti (disambiguation)
 Venetia (disambiguation)
 List of things named Venetian
 Phoenician (disambiguation)

Language and nationality disambiguation pages